Trachycarpus ukhrulensis is a plant species endemic to the Manipur region in Assam, India.

References

ukhrulensis
Flora of Assam (region)
Plants described in 2006